Peltogasterellidae is a small family of parasitic barnacles in the class Thecostraca. There 4 genera and about 10 described species in Peltogasterellidae.

Genera
These genera belong to the family Peltogasterellidae:
 Angulosaccus Reinhard, 1944
 Boschmaia Reinhard, 1958
 Cyphosaccus Reinhard, 1958
 Peltogasterella Krüger, 1912

References

Further reading

 

Barnacles